A , or , is a word that refers to factories that are largely duty free and tariff-free. These factories take raw materials and assemble, manufacture, or process them and export the finished product. Specific programs and laws have made Mexico's maquila industry grow rapidly.

History 
From 1942 to 1964, the Bracero program allowed men with farming experience to work on US farms on a seasonal basis, and its end ushered in a new era for the development of Mexico. The Border Industrialization Program (BIP) began in 1965 and allowed for a lowering in restrictions and duties on machinery, equipment and raw materials. Before this program, PRONAF, a national border program for infrastructure developments like building roads, parks, electricity, water, building factories, and cleaning up border cities, helped to improve situations along the US-Mexico Border. With BIP, foreign firms were able to use factories built under PRONAF to import raw materials and export goods for a cheaper cost than in other countries. One of the main goals of the Border Industrialization Program was to attract foreign investment.

In 1989, the federal government put in place specific procedures and requirements for maquilas under the “Decree for Development and Operation of the Maquiladora Industry”. After the Mexican debt crisis of 1980, the economy liberalized and foreign investment increased. Factory jobs began to leave central Mexico, and workers followed the jobs from central Mexico to the maquilas in the north and on the border. In 1985, maquiladoras overtook tourism as the largest source of foreign exchange, and since 1996 they have been the second largest industry in Mexico behind the petroleum industry.

NAFTA 
With the introduction of NAFTA in 1994, Northern Mexico became an export processing zone. This allowed multinational corporations from the US to produce products cheaply. Corporations could use a maquila to import materials and produce a good more cheaply than in the US by paying Mexican laborers lower wages and paying less in duties. Mexicans work for approximately one-sixth of the U.S. hourly rate. During the five years before NAFTA, maquila employment had grown at a rate of 47%; this figure increased to 86% in the next five years. The number of factories also increased dramatically. Between 1989 and 1994, 564 new plants opened; in the five years following, 1460 plants opened. However, the maquiladora growth is largely attributable to growth in US demand and devaluation of the peso, not NAFTA itself. In the 1970s, most maquiladoras were located around the Mexico–United States border. By 1994, these were spread in the interior parts of the country, although the majority of the plants were still near the border.

The 2000s 
A 2011 Federal Reserve report indicated that the maquiladora industry affects U.S. border city employment in service sectors. Although the maquiladora industry suffered due to the early 2000s recession, maquiladoras constituted 54% of the US-Mexico trade in 2004, and by 2005, the maquiladora exports accounted for half of Mexico's exports. In the 2000s, the maquila industry faced competition due to rise of other countries with availability of cheap labor, including Malaysia, India, and Pakistan. The biggest threat came from China's Special Economic Areas.

Growth and development
During the later half of the 1960s, maquiladora industries rapidly expanded geographically and economically and by 1985, had become Mexico's second largest source of income from exports, behind oil. Since 1973, maquiladoras have also accounted for nearly half of Mexico's export assembly. Between 1995 and 2000, exports of assembled products in Mexico tripled, and the rate of the industry's growth amounted to about one new factory per day. By the late twentieth century, the industry accounted for 25 percent of Mexico's gross domestic product, and 17 percent of total Mexican employment.

Globalization 
Since globalization and physical restructuring have contributed to the competition and advent of low-cost offshore assembly in places such as China, and countries in Central America, maquiladoras in Mexico have been on the decline since 2000. According to federal sources, approximately 529 maquiladoras shut down and investment in assembly plants decreased by 8.2 percent in 2002 after the imposition of countervailing duties on Chinese products, not available in North America, that were part of the electronics supply chain. Despite the decline, over 3,000 maquiladoras still exist along the 2,000 mile-long United States–Mexico border, providing employment for approximately one million workers, and importing more than $51 billion in supplies into Mexico. Research indicates that maquiladoras' post-NAFTA growth is connected to changes in Mexican wages relative to those in Asia and in the United States, and to fluctuations in U.S. industrial production. As of 2006, maquiladoras still accounted for 45 percent of Mexico's exports.  Maquiladoras, in general, are best represented among operations that are particularly assembly intensive.

Women

Women enter the labor force 
Women entered the labor force in Mexico in large numbers in the latter half of the 20th century. Devaluations of the peso in 1982 and 1994 pushed many Mexican women into the labor force. Between 1970 and 1995, 18% more women were part of the working force, and many of these women were working in maquila factories. Women looked for work in factories because they could get jobs with few credentials and receive on the job training. Men working in maquilas were given positions of supervision, management, engineers, and technical jobs, while women were relegated to low-skill jobs. Young women tended to be hired more often than older women, but it depended on the circumstances of the job and type of factory. However, young single women often ended up in factories with better working conditions, like the electronics plants, while older women and mothers worked in more dangerous apparel factories.

Poverty is a key factor that motivates women to work in maquiladoras. The minimum wage set by the Mexican government is barely enough to help sustain a family even with both parents working. The minimum wage "buys only about a quarter of the basic necessities that are essential for a typical worker’s family".  Maquilas pay at much higher rate than the minimum wage in most markets since there is a lot of competition for the best workers, and workers will not work without transportation and other bonuses. The 2015 minimum wage was 70.1 pesos per day in Tijuana (minimum wages vary by zone and worker classification) or about $0.55 per hour at the 2016 exchange rate of 16 pesos per dollar, while most entry-level positions in maquilas paid closer to $2 per hour including bonuses and 25% being paid to Social Security, housing, and retirement. Even in maquila factories, wages are still very low and in many families the children are encouraged to start working at an early age to support the family. In some maquiladoras, workers are cut and their responsibilities are given to a single worker. These workers are not given a higher pay, and are expected to maintain their output without a decrease in quality. They often work involuntary overtimes and are often not paid for their extra labor.

Gender inequality 

Allegedly, women are not allowed to be pregnant while working. Some maquilas require female workers to take pregnancy tests. Some require that workers resign if they are pregnant. Female applicants are made to take pregnancy tests and are only hired if not pregnant, and women that become pregnant while working at maquila factories are given more strenuous tasks and forced to work unpaid overtime to influence them to resign. The Humans Rights Watch wrote a report in 1996 about the failures of the government to address this issue despite the fact that pregnancy testing violates Mexican federal labor law. These practices have continued into the 21st century. Once on the job, many women face sexual harassment by supervisors and find no help from human resources.

Many women are injured in maquilas. Intense work pace and pressure on high production leads to injuries including upper back, neck, and shoulder pain. Many maquilas do not report accidents and workers are not compensated for injuries received on the job. Workplace hazards include toxic chemicals, and workplaces lack health and safety practices like ventilation and face masks.

Unionization 
Labor unions exist in maquiladoras, but many are charro unions, which are government supported and not in the interest of the worker. Official unions discredit maquiladora workers by calling them "agitators". Workers who complain can be fired and blacklisted from other jobs. Many contracts are only for a few months, allowing companies to have a high turn-over rate in which workers never have the chance to organize for their rights. Many tried to organize independent unions, but often failed. In 1993, the Mexican labor federation, the Authentic Labor Front, and the United Electrical Workers worked together to improve conditions at the General Electric factory, but failed in the loss of an election. The Center for Labor Studies (CETLAC) was opened in the mid 1990s and worked to educate workers about their rights and activism decreased in light of violence against women. In Juarez, between 1993 and 2005, more than 370 women were murdered. In 2010, more than 370 women were murdered. A new wave of worker protests has emerged in the 21st Century as workers decide that enough is enough. In 2015 in Juarez, maquiladora workers set up encampments, plantons, to protest and demand independent unions.

The Han Young Case 
The Han Young maquiladora was a plant in Tijuana, MX, that manufactured car parts for Hyundai. In 1997, what started as a complaint by a single injured worker turned into a years-long conflict where employees protested for their right to unionize. The struggle put the NAFTA labor side agreement to the test, but despite the workers' efforts, nothing ever came of it. The case became increasingly political and news-worthy as time went on. However, despite various US NAO hearings and transnational labor rights organizing, the workers were never able to unionize. On the contrary, by the end of the conflicts, all of the laborers had been fired and the maquiladora had been moved to the other side of Tijuana. This was in the face of a Mexican federal court ruling that the strikes had been legal and in fact the corporation had violated the law.

Environmental effects
Both the United States and Mexican governments claim to be committed to environmental protection, yet environmental policies have not always been enforced despite the fact that⁠⁠ maquilas are required to be certified and to provide an environmental impact statement. In Mexico, most maquiladoras are global players that use international standards for waste treatment and disposal that exceed Mexican requirements and that require any waste generated to be re-exported. The La Paz Agreement signed by Mexico and the United States in 1983 requires hazardous waste created by United States corporations to be transported back to the United States for disposal. However, the United States Environmental Protection Agency (EPA) reports that only 91 of the 600 maquiladoras located along the Texas–Mexico border have returned hazardous waste to the United States since 1987. The United States Geological Survey, the state of California, and the Imperial County Health Department—among others—have all asserted that the New River, which flows from Mexicali, Baja California, Mexico near the Mexico–United States border into California's Salton Sea, is "the dirtiest river in America". The presence of toxic waste in towns near maquila factories has led to negative health outcomes for the people living there. Between 1988 and 1992, 163 children in Juarez were born without brains due to the toxic chemicals from factories.

Improvement 
There have been some improvement at the corporate level of environmental policy. As of the early 2000s, around 90% of maquiladoras had attained an environmental certification. This push to improve environmental policy was led by the Mexican government, not the international companies themselves. The EPA's US–Mexico Border 2012 Program has an extensive plan to help with environmental issues along that border.

See also

 Dominican Republic–Central America Free Trade Agreement
 Economy of Mexico
 Free Trade Area of the Americas
 Free trade
 Globalization
 Colonia (Mexico)
 Latin American economy
List of free-trade zones
 Maquila Decree
 Maquila Solidarity Network

References

Further reading

Books

Journal articles
Brown, Garrett D. "Protecting Workers’ Health and Safety in the Globalizing Economy through International Trade Treaties". International Journal of Occupational and Environmental Health. Apr-Jun 2005.
Choi, Dae Won and Martin Kenney. "The Globalization of Korean Industry: Korean Maquiladoras in Mexico." (Archive) Frontera Norte, January–July 1997. Volume 5, No. 7. p. 5-22. Article in English, abstract available in Spanish.
Clapp, Jennifer. Piles of Poisons: Despite NAFTA’s Green Promises, Hazardous Waste Problems are Deepening in Mexico. Alternatives Journal, Vol. 28, Iss. 2. Waterloo: Spring 2002.
Hampton, Elaine. Globalization Legacy: A View of U.S. Factory Involvement in Mexican Education. Multicultural Education. Summer 2004.
Hausman, Angela and Diana L. Haytko. Cross-Border Supply Chain Relationships: Interpretive Research of Maquiladora Realized Strategies. The Journal of Business and Industrial Marketing, Vol 18, Iss. 6/7. Santa Barbara: 2003
Moffatt, Allison. Murder, Mystery and Mistreatment in Mexican Maquiladoras. Women & Environments International Magazines 66 (2006): 19.
Villalobos, J. Rene, et al., Inbound for Mexico. Industrial Engineer. Norcross: April 2004. Vol. 36, Iss. 4.

Government/NGO reports
Gruben, William C. and Sherry L. Kiser. The Border Economy: NAFTA and Maquiladoras: Is the Growth Connected? Federal Reserve Bank of Dallas. June 2001.
 Human Rights Watch. No Guarantees: Sex Discrimination in Mexico’s Maquiladora Sector. The Maquiladora Reader. Philadelphia: Mexico-U.S. Border Program, 1999.

News
 Article on worker-run maquiladora in El Salvador

Music 
 Maquiladora - Radiohead

Video
Campbell, Monica. Maquiladoras: Rethinking NAFTA. PBS, 2002.
The Human Race: Escaping From History. dir. Josh Freed. Green Lion Productions Inc., videocassette, 1994.
 Maquilapolis Documentary

External links
Maquiladora Slavery,  June 1, 2009

 CorpWatch, Maquiladoras at a Glance. June 30, 1999.
International Museum of Women Feature on Maquiladoras

Foreign trade of Mexico
Foreign trade of the United States
Mexico–United States relations
Spanish words and phrases